Ward v. Race Horse, 163 U.S. 504 (1896), is a United States Supreme Court case  argued on March 11–12, 1896, and decided on 25 May 1896.

Case Syllabus
The provision in the Treaty of February 24, 1869, with the Bannock Indians, whose reservation was within the limits of what is now Wyoming, that "they shall have the right to hunt upon the unoccupied lands of the United States so long as game may be found thereon," etc., does not give them the right to exercise this privilege within the limits of that state in violation of its laws.

This appeal was taken from an order of the court below, rendered in a habeas corpus proceeding, discharging the appellee from custody. 70 F. 598. The petition for the writ based the right to the relief which it prayed, and which the court below granted, on the ground that the detention complained of was in violation of the Constitution and laws of the United States and in disregard of a right arising from and guarantied by a treaty made by the United States with the Bannock Indians. Because of these grounds, the jurisdiction below existed, and the right to review here obtains. Rev.Stat. § 753; Act March 3, 1891, 36 Stat. 826. The record shows the following material facts: the appellee, the plaintiff below, was a member of the Bannock tribe of Indians, retaining his tribal relations and residing with it in the Fort Hall Indian reservation. This reservation was created by the United States in compliance with a treaty entered into between the United States and the Eastern band of Shoshonees and the Bannock tribe of Indians which took effect February 24, 1869, 15 Stat. 673. Article 2 of this treaty, besides setting apart a reservation for the use of the Shoshonees, provided:

"It is agreed that whenever the Bannocks desire a reservation to be set apart for their use, or whenever the President of the United States shall deem it advisable for them to be put upon a reservation, he shall cause a suitable one to be selected for them in their present country, which shall embrace reasonable portions of the 'Port Neuf' and 'Kansas Prairie' countries."

In pursuance of the foregoing stipulation, the Fort Hall Indian reservation was set apart for the use of the Bannock tribe.

Article 4

"The Indians herein named agree, when the agency house and other buildings shall be constructed on their reservations named, they will make said reservations their permanent home, and they will make no permanent settlement elsewhere; but they shall have the right to hunt upon the unoccupied lands of the United States so long as game may be found thereon and so long as peace subsists among the whites and Indians on the borders of the hunting districts."

In July, 1868, an act had been passed erecting a temporary government for the Territory of Wyoming, 15 Stat. 178, c. 235, and in this act it was provided as follows:

"That nothing in this act shall be construed to impair the rights of persons or property now pertaining to the Indians in said territory so long as such rights shall remain unextinguished by treaty between the United States and such Indians."

Wyoming was admitted into the Union on July 10, 1890. 26 Stat. 222, c. 664. Section 1 of that act provides as follows:

"That the State of Wyoming is hereby declared to be a state of the United States of America, and is hereby declared admitted into the Union on an equal footing with the original states in all respects whatever, and that the constitution which the people of Wyoming have formed for themselves be, and the same is hereby, accepted, ratified, and confirmed."

The act contains no exception or reservation in favor of or for the benefit of Indians.

The Legislature of Wyoming, on July 20, 1895 (Laws of Wyoming, 1895, p. 225, c. 98), passed an act regulating the killing of game within the state. In October, 1895, the District Attorney of Uinta County, State of Wyoming, filed an information against the appellee (Race Horse) for having killed in that county seven elk in violation of the law of the state. He was taken into custody by the sheriff, and it was to obtain a release from imprisonment authorized by a commitment issued under these proceedings that the writ of habeas corpus was sued out. The following facts are unquestioned: 1st, that the elk were killed in Uinta County, Wyoming, at a point about one hundred miles from the Fort Hall Indian reservation, which is situated in the State of Idaho; 2d, that the killing was in violation of the laws of the State of Wyoming; 3d, that the place where the killing took place was unoccupied public land of the United States in the sense that the United States was the owner of the fee of the land; 4th, that the place where the elk were killed was in a mountainous region some distance removed from settlements, but was used by the settlers as a range for cattle and was within election and school districts of the State of Wyoming.

References

External links
 Who gets to hunt Wyoming's elk? Tribal Hunting Rights, U.S. Law and the Bannock 'War' of 1895
 

1896 in United States case law
United States Supreme Court cases
United States Supreme Court cases of the Fuller Court
United States Native American treaty case law
Native American history of Wyoming
Bannock people